Aaron Schwartz (born January 4, 1981) is an American actor, known for playing the lead role of Gerald Garner in the 1995 comedy film Heavyweights, and for the role of Dave Karp in the 1992 Walt Disney film The Mighty Ducks. In addition to his two film roles, Schwartz played Clem Lanell in eight episodes of The Adventures of Pete & Pete, and appeared in one episode of The Cosby Show. He had a recurring role as doorman Vanya on The CW's teen drama series Gossip Girl and its spin-off web series Chasing Dorota.

Schwartz is Jewish.

Award nominations
Schwartz, together with the rest of the young cast of The Mighty Ducks, was nominated for the Outstanding Young Ensemble Cast in a Motion Picture award at the 14th Youth in Film Awards (1991–1992).

Filmography

See also
 List of Gossip Girl characters#Guest stars

References

External links

1981 births
20th-century American male actors
21st-century American male actors
American male child actors
American male film actors
American male television actors
Living people
Male actors from New York City